Jean Dufaux (born 7 June 1949) is a Belgian comic book writer. Beginning his professional career as a journalist for "CINÉ-PRESSE", Dufaux started writing comic books in the 1980s.  Perhaps his most well-known, and certainly his most long-running, series is Jessica Blandy.

Selected works
Le Bois des Vierges (1 volume, illustrated by Béatrice Tillier)
Complainte des landes perdues
Djinn (13 volumes, illustrated by Ana Mirallès)
Jessica Blandy (24 volumes, illustrated by Renaud)
Monsieur Noir (2 volumes, illustrated by Griffo)
Giacomo C. (15 volumes, illustrated by Griffo)
Murena (8 volumes, illustrated by Philippe Delaby)
Rapaces (4 volumes, illustrated by Enrico Marini)
Les Rochester (6 volumes, illustrated by Philippe Wurm)
Crusade (4 volumes. illustrated by Philippe Xavier)
 L'impératrice rouge (4 volumes, illustrated by Philippe Adamov)
 Pasolini — Pig! Pig! Pig! (1 volume, illustrated by Massimo Rotundo)

References

External links
Short biography (english)
Biography (french)

1949 births
Living people
People from East Flanders
Belgian comics writers
French graphic novelists